Rumpole's Return is a 1980 novel by John Mortimer about the defence barrister Horace Rumpole. It was based on a script for a two-hour Rumpole telemovie of the same name.

The plot concerns Rumpole coming out of retirement in Florida to work on a case.

References

Works by John Mortimer
1980 short story collections